Darmstadt Ost station is a railway station in the eastern part of the town of Darmstadt, located in Hesse, Germany.

Rail services

References

Ost
Railway stations in Germany opened in 1869